Colton railway station is a closed railway station on the North Coast railway line in Queensland. It was the junction for the (now closed) Urangan railway line that extended from Colton to Takura, Stockyard Creek, Walligan, Nikenbah, Urraween, Kawungan, Pialba, Scarness, Torquay and finally Urangan and the Urangan Pier in Hervey Bay. Much of the Urangan line has now been removed, as has Colton station itself.

See also
Hervey Bay railway line

References

Disused railway stations in Queensland
North Coast railway line, Queensland